Kudermetov is a Tatar masculine surname, its feminine counterpart is Kudermetova. The surname may refer to the following notable people: 
 Eduard Kudermetov (born 1972), Russian ice hockey forward
 Polina Kudermetova (born 2003), Russian tennis player, daughter of Eduard
 Veronika Kudermetova (born 1997), Russian tennis player, daughter of Eduard

Tatar-language surnames